Neolethaeus is a genus of dirt-colored seed bugs in the family Rhyparochromidae. There are more than 20 described species in Neolethaeus, found mainly in Asia, Australia, and Africa.

Species
These 27 species belong to the genus Neolethaeus:

 Neolethaeus aethiopicus Hesse, 1925
 Neolethaeus alienus (Walker, 1872)
 Neolethaeus assamensis (Distant, 1901)
 Neolethaeus australiensis Woodward, 1963
 Neolethaeus cantrelli Woodward, 1968
 Neolethaeus carinulatus (Breddin, 1907)
 Neolethaeus cheesmanae Woodward, 1968
 Neolethaeus dallasi (Scott, 1874)
 Neolethaeus densus Li & Bu, 2006
 Neolethaeus descriptus (Walker, 1872)
 Neolethaeus distinctus Li & Bu, 2006
 Neolethaeus esakii (Hidaka, 1962)
 Neolethaeus extremus (Walker, 1872)
 Neolethaeus formosanus (Hidaka, 1962)
 Neolethaeus giganteus Scudder, 1963
 Neolethaeus greeni (Kirby, 1891)
 Neolethaeus indicus Mukhopadhyay, 1988
 Neolethaeus lewisi (Distant, 1883)
 Neolethaeus maculacellus Li & Bu, 2006
 Neolethaeus maculosus Slater & O'Donnell, 1999
 Neolethaeus madagascariensis Slater & O'Donnell, 1999
 Neolethaeus polhemi Slater & O'Donnell, 1999
 Neolethaeus signatus (Distant, 1901)
 Neolethaeus tenebrosus (Distant, 1914)
 Neolethaeus tokarensis (Hidaka, 1962)
 Neolethaeus typicus Distant, 1909
 Neolethaeus ulugurus Scudder, 1962

References

External links

 

Rhyparochromidae